In baseball, a single is the most common type of base hit, accomplished through the act of a batter safely reaching first base by hitting a fair ball (thus becoming a runner) and getting to first base before a fielder puts him out.  As an exception, a batter-runner reaching first base safely is not credited with a single when an infielder attempts to put out another runner on the first play; this is one type of a fielder's choice.  Also, a batter-runner reaching first base on a play due to a fielder's error trying to put him out at first base or another runner out (as a fielder's choice) is not credited with a single.

On a single hit to the outfield, any runners on second base or third base normally score, and sometimes the runner from first base is able to advance to third base.  Depending on the location of the hit, a quick recovery by the outfielder can prevent such an advance or create a play on the advancing runner.

Hitters who focus on hitting singles rather than doubles or home runs are often called "contact hitters".  Contact hitters who rely on positioning their hits well and having fast running speed to achieve singles are often called "slap hitters".  Ty Cobb, Pete Rose, Tony Gwynn, and Ichiro Suzuki are examples of contact hitters; of these, Rose and Suzuki might be called slap hitters. 

Unlike doubles or other types of extra base hits, singles do not remove the possibility of multiple force plays on the next fair ball; in fact, the batter achieving the single will be forced to advance to second base on the next play, creating the possibility of a force double play.

Symbol
There is no universally accepted symbol for a single.  Most often, singles are not reported; rather, the total number of hits, doubles, triples, and home runs is reported; then, hits minus these "extra base hits" yields the number of singles.

Sometimes, 1B is used as the symbol for singles; however, this symbol is more commonly used for the first baseman or for first base itself.  Another possible symbol is a horizontal line, -.  The letter S is never used as a symbol for single, because it is the symbol for strike.

Singles leaders, Major League Baseball

Career

 Pete Rose - 3215
 Ty Cobb - 3053
 Eddie Collins - 2643
 Cap Anson - 2598
 Derek Jeter -  2595
 Willie Keeler -2513
 Ichiro Suzuki - 2464
 Honus Wagner - 2422
 Rod Carew - 2404
 Tris Speaker - 2383

Season
 Ichiro Suzuki - 225
 Willie Keeler (1898) - 206
 Ichiro Suzuki - 203
 Lloyd Waner - 198
 Willie Keeler (1897) - 193

Game

Johnny Burnett holds the record for most singles in a game. He hit seven singles on July 10, 1932 for the Cleveland Indians in an 18–17 loss to the Philadelphia Athletics. 19 players have hit six singles in a game.

See also
 Infield hit
 Single (cricket)
 Double (baseball)
 Triple (baseball)
 Home Run

References

External links
 List of career singles leaders, Baseball-Reference.com
 List of single-season singles leaders, Baseball-Reference.com
 Yearly League Leaders & Records for Singles (Baseball-Reference.com)

Baseball terminology
Batting statistics